Dick Brown is an American curler. Brown was the skip on a team out of Hibbing Curling Club in Hibbing, Minnesota which won the US National Championship two times, in 1959 and 1962. The team was mostly family, including Brown's father-in-law Fran Kleffman at second and brother-in-law Terry Kleffman at third. The only non-family member was Nick Jerulle at lead.  In 1962 the team represented the United States at the World Championship, which was then called the 1962 Scotch Cup. This was only the second time the United States had competed in the Championship. Brown's team finished with a 4–2 record, good enough to earn them the silver medal.

References

External links
 

American male curlers
Living people
American curling champions
Year of birth missing (living people)